Birsent Hamdi Karagaren (born 6 December 1992) is a Bulgarian professional footballer who plays as a winger for CSKA 1948 and the Bulgarian national team. He made his debut for his country in October 2019.

Career

Early career
Born in Asenovgrad, Karagaren played as a youth for local club Asenovets and Lokomotiv Plovdiv. He also spent time at Shumen, Etar 1924 and Vereya, before joined Lokomotiv Plovdiv in 2014.

Dunav Ruse
On 19 January 2017 Karagaren signed for Dunav Ruse from Lokomotiv Plovdiv. He made his debut for the team on 17 February 2017 in a 0:4 loss to Beroe. In the next match for the league on 24 February, he scored both goals for the 2:0 win against Botev Plovdiv, becoming a man of the match. He scored again in the match against Levski Sofia on 28 February 2017.

International career
Karagaren received his first call-up for senior Bulgarian squad in October 2019 for the UEFA Euro 2020 qualifying matches against Montenegro and England on 11 and 14 October. He made his debut on 11 October 2019 in a game against Montenegro. He substituted Wanderson in the 77th minute.

Career statistics

Club

Honours

Club
Lokomotiv Plovdiv
 Bulgarian Cup (2): 2018–19, 2019–20
 Bulgarian Supercup: 2020

References

External links

1992 births
Living people
Bulgarian footballers
Bulgaria international footballers
FC Etar 1924 Veliko Tarnovo players
FC Vereya players
PFC Lokomotiv Plovdiv players
FC Dunav Ruse players
First Professional Football League (Bulgaria) players
Bulgarian people of Turkish descent
Association football midfielders
People from Asenovgrad